Taipei Economic and Cultural Representative Office in Japan (TECO; , Japanese 台北駐日経済文化代表処 Taihoku Zainichi Keizai Bunka Daihyou Sho) represents the interests of Taiwan in Japan, functioning as a de facto embassy in the absence of diplomatic relations. It is operated by the Taiwan–Japan Relations Association, a parastatal agency of the government.

Its Japanese counterpart is the Japan–Taiwan Exchange Association in Taipei.

History
The Association of East Asian Relations (AEAR) was established in 1972 after the government of Japan severed its diplomatic relations with Taiwan, replacing the Republic of China's embassy in Tokyo, and its consulates-general in Yokohama, Osaka and  Fukuoka. In 1992, the offices in Japan adopted the current name. In 2017, AEAR was renamed Taiwan–Japan Relations Association.

However, the situation in Okinawa was different. Okinawa had been occupied by the United States since the end of World War II until 1972, and its name under the occupation was Ryukyu. In 1958, the ROC established Sino-Ryukyuan Cultural and Economic Association.  After Okinawa's return to Japan in May 1972 and the severance of diplomatic relations in September, the Office in Okinawa remained with the same name.  This office, under a different title, had existed simultaneously with the TECRO offices in Japan until 2006, when  the office in Okinawa was merged into the Office in Tokyo.

This curiosity may have arisen because the Ryūkyū Kingdom was a tributary state of China (the Ming and Qing Dynasties) before the 19th century, and consequently the ROC, as the successor government of the Qing, may for historical reasons have distinguished Okinawa from Japan. However, in 2006, Taiwan officially acknowledged that Okinawa is now part of Japan.
It now has liaison offices in Tokyo, Osaka and Fukuoka and branches of the Tokyo Office in Yokohama, Naha and Sapporo.

Representatives

AEAR Representatives
Ma Shu-li,  1973–1985
 Mou Shung-nian, 1985
 Ma Chi-chuang, 1985–1990
 Chiang Hsiao-wu, 1990–1991
 Hsu Shui-teh,  1991–1993

TECO Representatives
 Lin Chin-ching, 1993–1996
 Chuang Ming-yao, 1996–2000
 Lo Fu-chen, 2000–2004
 Koh Se-kai, 2004–2008
 John Feng, 2008–2012
 Shen Ssu-tsun, 2012–2016
 Frank Hsieh, 2016–

See also
 Taipei Economic and Cultural Representative Office
 Japan–Taiwan relations

References

External links 

 Taipei Economic and Cultural Representative Office in Japan
 Taiwan–Japan Relations Association

Japan
Taiwan
1972 establishments in Japan
Diplomatic missions in Tokyo
Organizations established in 1972
Politics of Taiwan
Japan–Taiwan relations